HMS Havannah was a Royal Navy 36-gun fifth-rate frigate. She was launched in 1811 and was one of twenty-seven s. She was cut down to a 24-gun sixth rate in 1845, converted to a training ship in 1860, and sold for breaking up in 1905.

War service

Havannahs first captain was George Cadogan, who commissioned her into the Channel Fleet. Havannah was rapidly involved in operations against French coastal shipping off the Channel Islands.

On 6 September 1811, the boats of Havannah, under the command of her first lieutenant, William Hamley, landed a party that spiked the three 12-pounder guns of a battery on the south-west side of the Penmarks. They then brought out several coasting vessels that had taken refuge under the guns, all without taking any losses.
 Schooner Aimable Fanny, laden with wine and brandy, and several chasse marees:
 St. Jean, laden with salt;
 Petit Jean Baptiste, laden with wine and brandy;
 Buonaparte, laden with wine and brandy;
 Voltigeur, laden with wine and brandy; and
 lastly, one of unknown name, laden with wine and brandy, dismantled and set on fire but later extinguished.

On 25 December Havannah sailed for the Mediterranean. In 1812, Cadogan took Havannah to join the squadron operating in the Adriatic from the island of Lissa. On 24 April 1812 ,  and Havannah landed Lieutenant-colonel George Duncan Robertson, his staff and a garrison at Port St. George on Lissa. The British had defeated a French naval force on 13 March at the Battle of Lissa and wanted to establish a base there with Robertson as its first Governor.

In early 1813 Havannah was detached to the Northern Italian coast where she conducted a five-month campaign against the shipping and shore facilities of Vasto and its environs. On 6 January 1813 Havannahs boats cut out Gunboat No. 8, armed with one long 24-pounder gun. She had a crew of 35 men under the command of M. Joseph Floreus, enseigne de vaisseau. Despite meeting a superior force and coming under small arms fire from the shore, the boats, under Lieutenant Hamley, captured the gunboat and three merchant vessels, their original target, as well. The British had one man killed and two men wounded in the operation. In May 1821, prize money for the gunboat, the three merchant vessels St Antonio No. 1, St Antonio No. 2 and St Antonio No. 3 was awarded, as well as prize money for two other vessels taken that day, Madona del Rosario and the settee Euphemia. On 14 January Havannah and  captured two small trabaccolos.

Three weeks later, on 7 February, Havannah destroyed four gunboats at Manfredonia. In numerous actions, she seized dozens of ships and destroyed coastal batteries. For instance, on 22 March 1813 the ship's boats captured at Vasto one trabaccolo, armed with three 9-pounder guns and destroyed another. Then on 26 March, her boats brought out five armed trabacolos and five feluccas laden with salt that had been run up on the beach near the town of Fortore. In both actions the enemy lost at least one man killed, while the British had only two men wounded in all. In May 1821 prize money for ten trabaccolos, one parenza, five feluccas, and their cargoes, captured between 22 March and 5 May, was paid.

On 18 July, while off Manfredonia, Havannah, with the sloop , attacked a small convoy and captured or destroyed all the vessels. They captured one Neapolitan gunboat armed with one 18-pounder gun, and burnt another. They also destroyed a pinnace armed with one 6-pounder gun. Lastly, they captured two trabaccolos armed with three guns each and laden with salt, and destroyed two others of the same strength and cargo.

In November 1813, Havannah was attached to Thomas Fremantle's squadron that blockaded and besieged Trieste. Cadogan used the ships' guns to establish batteries armed with two 32-pounder carronades, eight 18-pounder guns and seven long 12-pounder guns. He then attacked the city and captured it with the aid of some Austrian troops. In all, they captured 110 guns and 18 howitzers, 350 men, 100 dismounted guns and 12 gunboats. Cadogan was later instructed to hand over all prizes and spoils of war to the Austrians. (This order cost the crews of Havannah and Weazle an estimated £300,000 in prize money.) The Emperor of Austria, however, awarded Lieutenant Hamley the Imperial Austrian Order of Leopold for his services at Zara.

On 9 December Havannah and Weazel destroyed 17 gunboats.

In 1814 Havannah came under the command of Captain James Black (acting. On 6 February 1814, Apollo and Havannah were anchored outside Brindisi while the French frigate Uranie was inside the port, on fire.  had chased her into the port some weeks earlier while awaiting the officials of the port, which belonged to the Kingdom of Naples, to respond to the presence of the French vessel. When Apollo appeared on the scene and made signs of being about to enter the port, Uranies captain removed the powder from his ship and set her on fire.

On 15 April 1814, days before the end of the war, Havannah, under the command of (temporary) Captain Edward Sibly, captured the French privateer schooner Grande Isabelle off Corfu, together with the schooner's prize. The schooner carried four guns and 64 men and had sailed from Corfu on 9 April, before capturing a vessel sailing from Trieste to Messina.

Captain Gawen Hamilton recommissioned Havannah in April 1814 at Portsmouth. One was a naval brig of 12 guns and one a cutter of ten guns; two were schooners and three were chasse marees.

Havannah also shared in the prize money for the ship Abeona and the schooners Franklin and Saucy Jack, which other ships had captured between 21 October and 6 November in the Chesapeake. Similarly Havannah shared in the prize money for the schooner Mary and the goods from the transports Lloyd and Abeona, captured in the Chesapeake between 29 November and 19 December.

Peacetime service
In 1815 Havannah sailed for North America, but by 12 August 1815 she was part of the squadron accompanying , which was carrying Napoleon to exile in Saint Helena. In 1816 Havannah sailed to the Cape of Good Hope.

By 1819 Havannah was laid up at Sheerness. She underwent repairs between April 1819 and October 1822. From November 1821 she was again in commission and then was based in the Mediterranean. In 1830 she was in Sheerness again.

In 1845 she was cut down to a 24-gun sixth rate corvette carrying 32-pounder (40cwt) guns.

In February 1848 Captain J.E. Erskine took command. She then served on the New Zealand station between 1848 and 1851. She anchored twice in the sea between Efate, Lelepa, and Moso in Vanuatu, called Havannah Harbour after the ship.

She returned to Britain via Rio de Janeiro. She arrived at Devonport from Portsmouth on 7 December 1851. While approaching Britain, on 2 December she rendered assistance to the French ship Celine. Almost two years later her crew received an award of money for their services.

Captain T. Harvey took command in August 1855. Under him, Havannah served with the Pacific Station from 1855 to 1859. Havannah Channel in those waters is named for the ship, Port Harvey for its captain.

Fate
In 1860 Havannah was sent to Cardiff to serve as a "ragged school ship". She was sold for breaking up in 1905.

Notes, citations, and references

Notes

Citations

References
 James, William (1827) The Naval History of Great Britain, Volume 6 (1811–1827). (London, Printed for the Author). 0-85177-909-3.

External links
 Ships of the Old Navy

Apollo-class frigates
Fifth-rate frigates of the Royal Navy
Sixth rates of the Royal Navy
1811 ships
Ships built on the River Mersey
War of 1812 ships of the United Kingdom